Francevillite is a uranyl-group vanadate mineral in the tyuyamunite series. Francevillite is a strongly radioactive mineral. It is typically orange, yellow or brownish yellow. It forms a series with curienite.

Occurrence

Francevillite occurs in the oxidized zone of a lead-bearing uranium–vanadium deposits. Francevillite was first described in 1957 for an occurrence in its type locality of the idle Mounana uranium mine, near Franceville, Haut-Ogooué, Gabon and was named for the city.

At its type locality it is associated with curienite (a closely related uranyl vanadate), chervetite (a lead vanadate), and mounanaite (another lead vanadate). At other localities, francevillite is associated with duttonite, vanuralite, mottramite, carnotite, dewindtite, torbernite, uranopilite, johannite and kasolite.

References

Uranium(VI) minerals
Vanadate minerals
Orthorhombic minerals
Minerals in space group 60